Operation Diadem order of battle is a listing of the significant formations that were involved in the fighting on the Winter Line and at the Anzio bridgehead south of Rome during Operation Diadem in May - June 1944 which resulted in the Allied breakthrough at Cassino and the breakout at Anzio leading to the capture of Rome.

Allied Armies in Italy
C-in-C: General Sir Harold Alexander
Chief of Staff: Lieutenant-General Sir John Harding

U.S. Fifth Army
Commander: 
Lieutenant General Mark W. Clark

U.S. VI Corps (At Anzio)
Major General Lucian K. Truscott
 U.S. 3rd Infantry Division (Brigadier General John W. O'Daniel) until 25 May 1944
 British 1st Infantry Division (Major-General John Hawkesworth)
 U.S. 45th Infantry Division (Major General William W. Eagles)
 U.S. 1st Armored Division (Major General Ernest N. Harmon)
 U.S. 34th Infantry Division (Major General Charles W. Ryder)
 U.S. 36th Infantry Division (Major General Fred L. Walker) (from 18 May 1944)
 British 5th Infantry Division (Major-General Philip Gregson-Ellis)
 First Special Service Force (3 regiments of two battalions each, U.S. and Canadian) (Brigadier General Robert T. Frederick)

U.S. II Corps (on the Winter Line)
Major-General Geoffrey Keyes
 U.S. 88th Infantry Division (Major General John E. Sloan
 U.S. 85th Infantry Division (Major General John B. Coulter)
 1st U.S. Armored Group (three tank battalions)
 U.S. 3rd Infantry Division (Brigadier General John W. O'Daniel) (from 25 May)

Corps Expéditionnaire Français (French Expeditionary Corps) (on the Winter Line)
 Général d'armée (General) Alphonse Juin
 3ème Division d'Infanterie Algérienne (3rd Algerian Infantry Division) (Général de division (Major-General) Joseph de Goislard de Monsabert)
 4ème Division Marocaine de Montagne (4th Moroccan Mountain Division) (Général de division (Major-General) François Sevez)
 2ème Division d'Infanterie Marocaine (2nd Moroccan Infantry Division) (Général de division(Major-General) André W. Dody)
 1ère Division Française Libre/1ère Division Motorisée d'Infanterie (1st Motorised Infantry Division) (Général de division (Major-General) Diego Brosset)
 Commandement des Goums Marocains (Command of Moroccan Goumiers - Three Groups of Tabors each comprising three tabors of 500 to 800 men) (Général de brigade (Brigadier-General) Augustin Guillaume)
 Corps Troops
7ème et 8ème Régiments de Chasseurs d'Afrique (7th and 8th African Light Cavalry Regiment) (M10 tank destroyers)
Régiment d'Artillerie Coloniale du Levant (Levant Colonial Artillery Regiment)
64ème Régiment d'Artillerie d'Afrique (64th African Artillery Regiment)
Groupe de canonniers-marins (Navy Artillery Battalion - two batteries)

Army Reserve
 H.Q. U.S. IV Corps
 U.S. 36th Infantry Division (Major-General Fred L. Walker) (Till 18 May 1944)

British Eighth Army (on the Winter Line)
Commander: 
Lieutenant-General Sir Oliver Leese

British XIII Corps
Lieutenant-General Sidney C. Kirkman
British 4th Infantry Division (Major-General Dudley Ward)
British 6th Armoured Division (Major-General Vyvyan Evelegh)
8th Indian Infantry Division (Major-General Dudley Russell)
British 78th Infantry Division (Major-General Charles Keightley)
1st Canadian Armoured Brigade (Brigadier W. C. Murphy)

I Canadian Corps
Lieutenant-General E. L. M. Burns
1st Canadian Infantry Division (Major-General Chris Vokes)
5th Canadian Armoured Division (Major-General Bert Hoffmeister)
British 25th Army Tank Brigade (Brigadier J.N. Tetley)

Polish II Corps
Lieutenant-General Władysław Anders
Polish 3rd Carpathian Rifle Division (Major-General Bolesław Bronisław Duch)
Polish 5th Kresowa Infantry Division (Major-General Nikodem Sulik)
Polish 2nd Armoured Brigade (Brigadier-General Bronislaw Rakowski)

British X Corps
Lieutenant-General Sir Richard L. McCreery
 2nd New Zealand Division (Lieutenant-General Sir Bernard Freyberg)
 British 24th Guards Brigade (Brigadier A.F.L. Clive)
 British 2nd Parachute Brigade (Brigadier C.H.V. Pritchard)
 12th South African Motorised Brigade (Brigadier R.J. Palmer)
 Italian Corps of Liberation (Six battalions and a regiment of artillery) (General Umberto Utili)

Army Reserve
 6th South African Armoured Division (Major-General Evered Poole)

British V Corps (On the Adriatic front in a holding role directly under A.A.I.)
Lieutenant-General Charles Allfrey
 4th Indian Infantry Division (Major-General Arthur Holworthy)
 10th Indian Infantry Division (Major-General Denys Reid)
British 23rd Armoured Brigade (Brigadier R.H.E. Arkwright)

German Army Group C
Commander:
Field Marshal Albert Kesselring

Army Group Reserve
1st Paratroop Panzer Division (Brigadier-General Wilhelm Schmalz) (in OKW Reserve)
26th Panzer Division (Lieutenant-General Smilo Freiherr von Lüttwitz)
29th Panzergrenadier Division (Lieutenant-General Walter Fries)
90th Panzergrenadier Division (Major-General Ernst-Günther Baade)
92nd Infantry Division (Major-General Werner Goeritz) (Tiber Coastal Command)

Fourteenth Army (at Anzio)
Commander: Lieutenant-General Eberhard von Mackensen (until end May 1944, then under direct command of Kesselring)

I Parachute Corps
Lieutenant-General Alfred Schlemm
3rd Panzergrenadier Division (Brigadier-General Hans Hecker to 1 June then Major-General Hans-Günther von Rost to 25 June then Major-General Walter Denkert)
4th Parachute Division (Major-General Heinrich Trettner)
65th Infantry Division (Major-General Hellmuth Pfeifer)

LXXVI Panzer Corps
Lieutenant-General Traugott Herr
362nd Infantry Division (Major-General Heinz Greiner)
715th Infantry Division (Major-General Hans-Georg Hildebrandt)

Tenth Army (on the Winter Line)
Commander: General Heinrich von Vietinghoff

XIV Panzer Corps
Lieutenant-General Frido von Senger und Etterlin (on leave 17 April to 17 May during which time Lieutenant-General Otto Hartmann)
 15th Panzergrenadier Division (Major-General Rudolf Sperl)
 71st Infantry Division (Major-General Wilhelm Raapke)
 94th Infantry Division (Major-General Bernhard Steinmetz)

LI Mountain Corps
Lieutenant-General Valentin Feurstein
 1st Parachute Division (Lieutenant-General Richard Heidrich)
 5th Mountain Division (Major-General Max-Günther Schrank)
 44th Infantry Division (Major-General Bruno Ortner)
 114th Jäger Division (Major-General Alexander Bourquin to 19 May 1944 then Major-General Hans Boelsen)

Korpsgruppe Hauck (on Adriatic front in holding role)
Major-General Friedrich-Wilhelm Hauck
 305th Infantry Division (Lieutenant-General Friedrich-Wilhelm Hauck)
 334th Infantry Division (Major-General Hellmuth Böhlke)

Armeegruppe von Zangen (in northern Italy)
Commander: Lieutenant-General Gustav von Zangen

LXXV Army Corps
Lieutenant-General Anton Dostler
 356th Infantry Division (Major-General Egon von Neindorff until 15 May then Major-General Karl Faulenbach)
 162nd Turkoman Division (Major-General Oskar von Niedermayer)

Corps Witthöft (Eastern sub-Alpine region)
Lieutenant-General Joachim Witthöft
 188th Mountain Division (Major-General Hans von Hößlin)
 278th Infantry Division (elements) (Major-General Harry Hoppe)

Corps Kübler (Adriatic coastal region)
Lieutenant-General Ludwig Kübler
 278th Infantry Division (most of) (Major-General Harry Hoppe)

References

Sources
 
 
 

 
 

Operation Diadem
Italian campaign (World War II)
Battle of Monte Cassino